Gavin Greenaway (born 15 June 1964) is an English music composer and conductor. He is the son of Roger Greenaway.

Early life and career
Educated at Strode's College and Trinity College of Music, Greenaway started working with his father before leaving school. Their compositions for BBC children's television include Jimbo and the Jet-Set, The Family Ness and Penny Crayon, as well as Channel 4's 1996 drama The Fragile Heart.

Greenaway also conducted the scores for the films The Thin Red Line, Gladiator and Pearl Harbor, all of which were composed by Hans Zimmer. He also conducted many scores for DreamWorks Animation such as Shrek, Chicken Run, Antz, Wallace & Gromit: The Curse of the Were-Rabbit, The Prince of Egypt, Bee Movie, and The Road to El Dorado. In addition, he was commissioned by Disney to compose the score for their fireworks show IllumiNations: Reflections of Earth and a parade called Tapestry of Nations at Epcot. The resulting pieces of music from the fireworks show have been used by Disney since 1999. With the permission from Disney, who hold the full rights to the composition and the Hal Leonard corp. who hold the publishing rights, Reflections of Earth has now been arranged for the idiom full symphonic wind band and dedicated to the Pennsylvania Symphonic Winds and their musical director Phil Evans. The first performance of this arrangement was in Radnor PA on 2 December 2012. For Tokyo DisneySea, he composed the score for "BraviSEAmo!", the pyrotechnics and water nightly show in 2004. He also conducted in Paul McCartney's oratorio Ecce Cor Meum. He has also provided music-only soundtracks to accompany VHS-releases such as The Everton Football Club Season Review 1988/89.

His music was heard during both the 2000 Super Bowl XXXIV Halftime Show and the 2010 Winter Olympics opening ceremony.

Greenaway was one of the composers commissioned to write music for the Thames Diamond Jubilee Pageant in 2012 in honour of the Diamond Jubilee of Elizabeth II. The piece, entitled The New Water Music, was inspired by the George Frederic Handel's Water Music and contained movements by several modern British composers working under the direction of Greenaway. After the pageant, Greenaway was critical of the BBC coverage of the pageant as the live broadcast did not feature the performance at all. In his personal blog, he expressed the view that the presenters had focused on interviewing celebrities while ignoring the musicians completely.

Il Falco Bianco is Gavin Greenaway's first solo piano album, released in May 2016.

He has also recently conducted music for the Star Wars anthology film, Solo: A Star Wars Story.

Filmography

Feature films

Video Games

References

External links
 
 https://web.archive.org/web/20071011154651/http://hans-zimmer.com/fr/mv/rcprod.php?numid=10
 https://www.gavingreenaway.com official website

1964 births
English conductors (music)
English film score composers
English male film score composers
English television composers
Living people
Male television composers
People educated at Strode's Grammar School